The 2008 Connecticut Republican presidential primary was held on February 5, 2008 (Super Tuesday) as the process by which the U.S. state of Connecticut selected the recipient of 27 of the state’s 30 delegates to the Republican National Convention in the process to elect the Republican candidate for the 44th President of the United States. It was a closed primary, restricted to enrolled members of the Republican Party.

Candidates
The following is the order in which Republican candidates appeared on Connecticut’s Republican primary ballot on February 5, 2008:
Rudolph Giuliani, Fred Thompson, Mitt Romney, John McCain, Duncan Hunter, Ron Paul, Mike Huckabee, and Alan Keyes.

By law, "uncommitted" appeared below the list of candidates on the ballots for both parties in Connecticut.

Candidates who withdrew from the race remained on the ballot in Connecticut if they had withdrawn after December 27, 2007. The only withdrawn Republican candidate who had been placed on the list of likely candidates in November who withdrew early enough to not appear on the Republican presidential ballot was Colorado Congressman Tom Tancredo. California Congressman Duncan Hunter, former Tennessee Senator Fred Thompson, and former New York City Mayor Rudy Giuliani withdrew after the December 27 cut-off date, thus they remained on the ballot.

History
Although the February 5, 2008 primary was the eighth presidential cycle since Connecticut replaced local primaries with a statewide primary in 1977, it was only the sixth primary to feature Republican candidates due to the unchallenged incumbents of Ronald Reagan in 1984 and George W. Bush in 2004. With John McCain having won the 2008 Republican nomination, Connecticut selected the eventual Republican nominee 67 percent of the time.

The February 5 primary was the first time Connecticut used the optical scan voting system for a primary. The state had first used the technology statewide in the 2007 municipal elections.

Opinion polling

Results

* Candidate dropped out of the race before the primary

See also
 2008 Connecticut Democratic presidential primary
 2008 Republican Party presidential primaries

References

Connecticut
2008 Connecticut elections
2008
2008 Super Tuesday

es:Primaria demócrata de Connecticut, 2008